Krewe of Boo is New Orleans' official Halloween parade krewe. The parade was created by the Mardi Gras World owner and founder Blaine Kern Sr. Krewe members must be at least 18 years of age.

The inaugural parade was held on Halloween night 2008 in conjunction with grand opening celebrations at the newly opened Eastbank location of Mardi Gras World located at the former River City Casino riverboat terminal. Kern, the founder of the krewe, wanted a traditional parade route uptown. However, Mayor Ray Nagin urged Kern to hold the parade downtown to increase tourist involvement.

References
 Kern's haunted house to aid first responders
 Halloween krewe will parade downtown

External links
 Krewe of Boo
 Mardi Gras World

Parades in the United States
Festivals in New Orleans
Tourist attractions in New Orleans